Au cœur de la nuit is an album by French rock band Téléphone, released in 1980.

The French edition of Rolling Stone magazine named this album the 13th greatest French rock album (out of 100).

Track listing 
All tracks composed by Jean-Louis Aubert; except where indicated
 "Au cœur de la nuit" - 3:28
 "Ploum ploum" - 1:54
 "Pourquoi n'essaies-tu pas ?" - 3:23
 "Seul" - 3:01
 "Laisse tomber" - 4:23
 "Un homme + un homme" - 2:00
 "Les ils et les ons" - 2:56
 "Argent trop cher" - 4:08
 "Ordinaire" - 2:36
 "2000 nuits" (Louis Bertignac) - 2:27
 "Fleur de ma ville" - 3:13
 "La laisse" - 3:24
 "Le silence" - 4:36

Personnel
Téléphone
Jean-Louis Aubert - vocals, guitar
Louis Bertignac - guitar, lead vocals in 2000 nuits
Corine Marienneau - bass
Richard Kolinka - drums
with:
Cowboy - saxophone on "Argent trop cher"
Lynn Goldsmith - photography

References 

Téléphone albums
1980 albums
Albums produced by Martin Rushent
Pathé-Marconi albums
Albums recorded at Electric Lady Studios